Juraj is a given name used in a number of Slavic languages, including Czech, Slovak, and Croatian. Pronounced "You-rye" but with a trilled r.

The English equivalent of the name is George.

Notable people
 Juraj Chmiel, Czech diplomat and politician
 Juraj Dobrila, Croatian bishop and benefactor
 Juraj Filas, Slovak composer
 Juraj Habdelić, Croatian writer and lexicographer
 Juraj Herz, Czechoslovakian director
 Juraj Jakubisko, Slovak director
 Juraj Jánošík, Slovak national hero 
 Juraj Križanić, Croatian Catholic missionary and first pan-Slavist
 Juraj Kucka, Slovak footballer
 Juraj Okoličány, Slovak ice hockey referee
 Juraj Sviatko, Slovak figure skater
 Josip Juraj Strossmayer, Croatian politician, Roman Catholic bishop
 Juraj Slafkovský, Slovak ice hockey player
 Juraj Hromkovič, Slovak Computer Scientist and Professor at ETH Zürich

Derived forms
 Jura: Czech, Slovak, Moravian, Croatian and Romanian
 Jure: Croatian, Slovene
 Jurica: Croatian
 Jurášek: Czech, Moravian
 Jurajko: Ukrainian, Slovak
 Jurik: Russian and Armenian
 Jurko: Slovak, Croatian
 Juro: Slovak, Croatian
 Jurek: Polish, Croatian

See also
 Other Slavic variants of George: Jurij, Yury, Đurađ, Đuro, Đuraš, Jerzy, Jiří

External links
Juraj on Behind The Name
Juraj on Babätko

Czech masculine given names
Slovak masculine given names
Croatian masculine given names
Masculine given names